Kansas City Confidential is a 1952 American film noir and crime film directed by Phil Karlson starring John Payne and Coleen Gray. The film was released in the United Kingdom as The Secret Four. Karlson and Payne teamed a year later for 99 River Street, another film noir, followed by Hell's Island, a film noir in color.

This film is now in the public domain.

Plot 

The ruthless Mr. Big is timing the arrival of an armored car picking up money from a bank and a flower delivery truck, driven by deliveryman John Rolfe. He plans to rob the armored car with three men:  Peter Harris (a gambler wanted for murder); Boyd Kane (a cop killer); and Tony Romano (a womanizing get-away driver). When interviewing them, he wears a mask so they cannot identify him. They were selected because each has a reason for fleeing the US.

The plan includes using a duplicate flower delivery truck. The robbery and pursuit go as planned, with each crook wearing a mask so none can identify each other. The gang arrives in the look-alike floral truck as Rolfe, unaware, drives away. The gang subdues the armored car guards, grabs the money and flees. Mr. Big gives each gang member a torn King playing card. He tells them to hang on to the cards and that, in case something goes wrong and Mr. Big cannot make it, the cards will serve to identify them to whoever he sends. The other members await the payment in Mexico.
 
The police arrest Rolfe and try to beat a confession out of him while he maintains his innocence. He gets released when his alibi checks out and the real robbery vehicle is found. Rolfe loses his job and decides to find the criminals and clear his name. He finds out Harris fled the city. Correctly believing he must be one of the robbers, Rolfe pursues him to Tijuana.

Rolfe finds and beats Harris into revealing the gang's meeting place. At the airport the police recognize Harris and kill him. Rolfe realizes he can impersonate Harris. In Harris’s luggage, he finds the mask and torn playing card.

In Borados, Rolfe meets Kane and Romano. Unknown to Rolfe, Mr. Big is there, too.  He is Tim Foster, a one-time high-ranking Kansas City police officer who was forced to retire when his name was linked to a scandal. His conversation with the insurance investigator of the Kansas City robbery, Scott, who Foster had summoned to Barados, reveals his plan: Foster never intended for the three goons to split the money and get away. He will spring a trap on them, pretend he solved the robbery, get the 25% reward for having done so, and possibly reclaim his job with the Kansas City police.

Foster's plan is thrown off when his daughter Helen, a law student, arrives. She tells her father she spoke to Kansas City's mayor, who agreed to look into the scandal that cost him his job. Foster tells Helen he doesn't want to return. She tells him she met Rolfe and likes him. That night Rolfe uses a game of poker as a pretext to show the gang members the torn card. Kane and Romano react, but Foster does not. He knows Rolfe is not Harris. Soon after, Rolfe catches Romano searching his room and beats him. Romano submits and they agree to cooperate until the money is split. Returning to his room the next day, Rolfe is beaten by Romano and Kane, who have teamed up. Kane knows Rolfe is an impostor because he was in prison with Harris. Helen knocks on the door and some quick thinking by Rolfe compels Romano and Kane to leave them alone.

Foster, as Mr. Big, writes individual notes to Rolfe, Kane, and Romano to meet him on his boat. Before it can happen, Kane and Romano try to ambush Rolfe, who gets the drop on them. He admits he is Rolfe, not Harris, and tells them he insists on getting Harris’s share.

Kane and Romano waylay Rolfe and discover he's going to the boat. All three are driven there by Foster, pretending to be going out fishing. They still do not know he is Mr. Big. On board, Rolfe escapes and comes across the money that Foster had made easy to spot. Romano, gun in hand, confronts him. To buy time, Rolfe shows him the money. Romano, planning to keep it all, kills Kane. Foster arrives on the scene, but says too much. Rolfe deduces he is Mr. Big and says so out loud. In the gun battle that follows, Foster kills Romano, but not before Romano fatally shoots him. As Foster is dying he tells Rolfe his one wish is that Helen doesn't find out his duplicity. With his dying breath, he tells the insurance investigator that Rolfe was his source and deserves the $300,000 reward for having helped recover the stolen money from the robbery.

Cast

 John Payne as Joe Rolfe
 Coleen Gray as Helen Foster
 Preston Foster as Tim Foster
 Neville Brand as Boyd Kane
 Lee Van Cleef as Tony Romano
 Jack Elam as Pete Harris
 Dona Drake as Teresa
 Mario Siletti as Tomaso
 Howard Negley as Andrews
 Carleton Young as Martin
 Don Orlando as Diaz
 Ted Ryan as Morelli

Background
Kansas City Confidential was the only film made by Edward Small's short-lived Associated Players and Producers, a company formed by Small, Sol Lesser and Sam Briskin. It was the first of a 13-movie deal Small signed with United Artists in 1952, with ten to be made in the first year. John Payne said he owned 25% of the film.

The movie originally was called Kansas City 117, the title based on a police code. Small bought the title Kansas City Confidential from John Gait and Lee Montgomery. It was the first contemporary crime drama Small made after a series of swashbucklers.

Filming started June 4, 1952, and was partly shot on Santa Catalina Island, California, which stood in for a Mexican village resort.

The story begins in Kansas City, but most of the film actually takes place at a fictitious fishing resort, Borados, in Mexico. Kansas City Confidential was director Karlson's second crime film; he also directed Scandal Sheet, also released in 1952, which proved to be a modest commercial success. Karlson was "a gifted filmmaker who had recently graduated from the Poverty Row studio Monogram"; the film starred John Payne, a "popular singer of the 1940s who some say was working his way down from Technicolor musicals at 20th Century Fox" but after his Fox contract expired produced several of his own films.

The plot served as inspiration for Quentin Tarantino's Reservoir Dogs.

Reception
The film was popular enough to usher in a series of "confidential" films from Edward Small: New York Confidential, Chicago Confidential, and Hong Kong Confidential.

Critical response
Variety wrote "With exception of the denouement, director Phil Karlson reins his cast in a grim atmosphere that develops momentum through succeeding reels. Payne delivers an impressive portrayal of an unrelenting outsider who cracks the ring. Time magazine said the film "combines a 'perfect crime' plot with some fair-to-middling moviemaking ... Obviously, the 'confidential' of the title does not refer to the picture's plot, which is a very model of transparency." Bosley Crowther of The New York Times was not a fan, writing that Kansas City Confidential "appears designed—not too adroitly—just to stimulate the curious and the cruel. The screen play by George Bruce and Harry Essex is an illogical fable of crime, the direction by Phil Karlson is routine and the leading role is bluntly acted by John Payne. Neville Brand, Jack Elam and Preston Foster do not shine in other roles, except as drab exponents of the violence that suffuses and corrupts this measly film."

When the film was released in DVD format in 2002, film critic Gary Johnson said, "This is prime Karlson. It's brutal, hard-edged, and unflinching, but it's also livened by a distinct streak of optimism. Whereas some directors of film noir preferred the deterministic pessimism of Out of the Past and Raw Deal, Karlson tempered the surface cynicism of his films with an underlying sense of hope." Dave Kehr of The New York Times gave MGM Home Entertainment's 2007 DVD release of the film an extensive review. He called the release an "immeasurable improvement over what had been available":
Kansas City Confidential, an imaginative little noir from 1952, exemplifies the bread-and-butter UA film of the 1950s ... Mr. Karlson, interestingly, concentrates on the story within the story: The leader of the gang is an embittered former police captain ... who dons a mask when he interviews prospective collaborators whose names he has drawn from police files ... The recruits are three young actors who would come to define menace in the 1950s and beyond: Neville Brand, Jack Elam and Lee Van Cleef, who here has his best role before For a Few Dollars More. Mr. Karlson's filmmaking has few of the standard noir flourishes: the dark and brooding shadows, the bizarrely canted camera angles. Instead, he works through gigantic close-ups and an unusually visceral treatment of bare-knuckle violence. With refinements, he would continue to pursue this theme (revenge) and this style, right up through his creative resurgence in the 1970s: Ben (1972), Walking Tall (1973) and Framed (1975).

Home video
As the film is in the public domain, there are innumerable releases with poor quality transfers from worn theatrical prints. In addition to many DVDs of poor to average quality, there are Blu-rays from Film Chest and HD Cinema Classics in the US, and Rimini Editions in France. However, these too only have fair to average quality transfers and are still superseded by the US DVD from MGM, holders of the only high quality, original vault materials on the film.

In popular culture
In a 1975 episode of the television series M*A*S*H, titled "The Gun", the showing of this film is announced over the intercom in the operating room, although the film had already been shown numerous times in the camp.

See also
 L.A. Confidential, a 1997 neo-noir film with similar themes
 List of films in the public domain in the United States
 List of United Artists films
 List of hood films

References

External links

 
 
 
 
 
 
  (public domain)

1952 films
1952 crime drama films
American crime drama films
1950s English-language films
Film noir
Films directed by Phil Karlson
United Artists films
Films set in Kansas City, Missouri
Films set in Mexico
Films produced by Edward Small
Films scored by Paul Sawtell
Films about robbery
American black-and-white films
1950s American films